Tolosa Nurgi Gigsa (born 29 March 1990) is an Ethiopian athlete specialising in the 3000 metres steeplechase. He represented his country at the 2015 World Championships in Beijing finishing 15th in the final.

His personal best in the event is 8:21.33 set in Rome in 2016.

Competition record

References

External links

1990 births
Living people
Ethiopian male steeplechase runners
World Athletics Championships athletes for Ethiopia
Place of birth missing (living people)
21st-century Ethiopian people